The Southern Cultivator is a defunct agrarian publication in the Southern United States.

History
The journal was started by J. W. Jones and W. S. Jones in Augusta, Georgia in 1843. Its publication started prior to De Bow's Review, which was established three years later, in 1846. Indeed, the Southern Cultivator has been said to be "the Confederacy's oldest, strongest, and intellectually most impressive agricultural journal." Its editors were Dennis Redmond and Charles Wallace Howard. Its publisher was J. P. Harrison.

Southern Cultivator was published twice a month. After the American Civil War of 1861-1865, its offices moved to Athens, Georgia. It was then moved to Atlanta. It later absorbed other similar publications, including the Dixie Farmer. The journal ceased publication in 1872.

Content
The primary readership of the journal was Southern planters. As a result, much of the content focused on agricultural matters. However, it also published articles about politics, education and literature. Indeed, the byline read, "Devoted to Southern Agriculture, Designed to improve the Mind, and Elevate the Characters of the Tillers of the Soil, and to Introduce a More Enlightened System of Culture.".

A large number of poems written by Confederate poets were published in its pages. They also described books published in the North as "evil." Moreover, author Bill Arp (1823-1906) had a monthly column in the journal. As the journal publisher, J. P. Harrison, also served as the publisher of Arp's books, the Southern Cultivator' also ran advertisements for those books.

Among its pages, some readers also discussed the recipe of mustang wine, a wine made from mustang grapes in Texas.

Digitalization
It has been digitalized by Duke University Libraries. Original copies are kept at the University of Illinois at Urbana–Champaign, Duke University, and Princeton University.

References

1843 establishments in Georgia (U.S. state)
Agricultural magazines
Biweekly magazines published in the United States
Defunct magazines published in the United States
Magazines established in 1843
Magazines disestablished in 1872
Magazines published in Georgia (U.S. state)
Magazines published in Atlanta
Mass media in Augusta, Georgia